Saint Arnold may refer to:

People
 Arnold Janssen
 Arnold of Arnoldsweiler, also known as Arnoldus, the confessor, and erroneously as Arnold(us), the Greek
 Arnold of Soissons

Other uses
Saint Arnold Brewing Company

See also
St Arnulf
Saint Arnaud (disambiguation), French spelling of the same name